Adélard Laurendeau (December 1, 1883 – July 21, 1968) was a politician in Quebec, Canada and a Member of the Legislative Assembly of Quebec (MLA).

Early life

He was born on December 1, 1883, in Montreal.  He became an industrial painter and a union activist.

Political career

He ran as a Labour candidate in the district of Maisonneuve in the 1919 provincial election and won.  He finished second in the 1923 election and was defeated by Conservative candidate Jean-Marie Pellerin.

Death

He died on July 21, 1968.

References

1883 births
1968 deaths
Labour Party (Quebec) MNAs
Politicians from Montreal